Gholurabad (also Romanized as Gholūrābād) is a village in Fahraj Rural District, in the Central District of Fahraj County, Kerman Province, Iran. At the 2006 census, its population was 192, in 38 families.

References 

Populated places in Fahraj County